SGES may refer to:
 Sun GlassFish Enterprise Server
 Shepherd Glen Elementary School
 McMaster School of Geography and Earth Sciences
 ICAO Airport Code for Guaraní International Airport